Francisco Ramírez, artistically known as Maldito Ramírez, (born January 2, 1984, Las Palmas de Gran Canaria) is an eclectic Canarian singer-songwriter, between indie and fresh Canarian folk marked to the rhythm of timple.

Biography 
 He was born on January 2, 1984, in Las Palmas de Gran Canaria. He lived between the capital of Gran Canaria and the Salinetas. In his adolescence he was in a tribute group to Rage Against the Machine, developing his artistic side from an early age.

He studied psychology at the Universidad Pontificia de Salamanca. He is a reference in the Canary Islands as a psychologist specialized in addiction and sexual therapy. He spent a decade living outside the Canary Islands, having a tour of the Peninsula, the Netherlands, Chile, Brazil and Argentina, where he was steeped in different musical styles along with experiences that inspired him for his musical creations.

Career 
 Maldito Ramírez released his debut album,  Jack Barba , in July 2014. This album opens the doors for him to local circuit festivals (such as the  Bioagaete  festival, where he has performed on various occasions and  NoSoloRock ) and international (WOMAD).

Some of his songs also become part of the B.S.O of the documentary Maresía.

In July 2016, he released his second album,  Turquesa . He has even made it to the top 40 list of  ClickandRoll  in October 2016, with the single  Searching a mulata,  which reaches the first position .  

He has given concerts on the  PlayaViva  route in the capital coast, and has many performances between the strings of his timple in both the Canary Islands and the Peninsula. In 2017 he performed at the  Lava Circular  festival in El Hierro. He has performed on various occasions at the Bioagaete festival. He has even performed at Rockwood Music Hall in New York City.

Discography 
 Jack Barba (2014)
 Turquesa (2016)
 Tuno Indio (2019)

Singles 
 En el Infierno (2014)
 Vuelve a darle al on (2016)

References

External links 
 Maldito Ramírez on Spotify
 Maldito Ramírez on YouTube
 Maldito Ramírez on Bandcamp
 Maldito Ramírez on Deezer

1984 births
Living people
Singers from the Canary Islands